Martin Oliver is an American former Negro league infielder who played in the 1930s.

Oliver made his Negro leagues debut in 1930 with the Memphis Red Sox. He went on to play for the Louisville Black Caps and Birmingham Black Barons, finishing his career with Birmingham in 1934.

References

External links
 and Seamheads

Year of birth missing
Place of birth missing
Birmingham Black Barons players
Louisville Black Caps players
Memphis Red Sox players
Baseball infielders